Wentian, officially the Wentian laboratory cabin module, is a major module of the Tiangong space station. It is the first Laboratory Cabin Module launched, and the first module to extend the existing Tianhe core module of the station. It was launched into orbit from the Wenchang Spacecraft Launch Site on 24 July 2022, successfully docking with Tianhe forward port at 19:13 UTC on the same day. On 25 July 2022 at 02:03 UTC, the crew of Shenzhou 14 opened the hatch and entered the module for the first time. 

Wentian was later relocated to the starboard port on 30 September 2022 at 04:44 UTC by the indexing robot arm to make way for the Mengtian module.

Purpose

The Wentian laboratory module provides additional navigation avionics, propulsion and orientation control as backup functions for the Tianhe Core Module (TCM). It also provides a pressurized environment for researchers to conduct science experiments in freefall or zero gravity which could not be conducted on Earth for more than a few minutes. Experiments can also be placed on the outside of the modules, for exposure to the space environment, cosmic rays, vacuum, and solar winds.

The axial port of Wentian is fitted with rendezvous equipment and first docked to the axial port of Tianhe. A mechanical arm dubbed, as Indexing robotic arm, looking as a sort of Lyappa arm used on the Mir space station moved the module to a starboard port of the TCM on 30 September 2022. It is different from the Lyappa as it works on a different mechanism. Mir's Lyappa arm is needed to control the pitch of the spacecraft and redocking in a different plane, but the Wentian indexing robot arm is used when docking is needed in the same plane. In addition to this arm used for docking relocation, the Chinarm on Tianhe module, could also had been used as a backup of the indexing robot arm.

It is used for manipulating extravehicular payloads and assisting EVAs. Its positioning accuracy is 5 times better than the Chinarm. Wentian in total has 22 standard adaptors (silver squares) to host the payloads. Wentian's arm is primarily be used to transfer experiments and other hardware outside the station. A dual-arm connector is installed on the Chinarm, providing it the capability to link with the 5-meter robotic arm, extending its reach and weight-carrying limits.

Electrical power is provided by two steerable solar power arrays, which use photovoltaic cells to convert sunlight into electricity. With a wingspan of over 55 m (180 ft), each array has an energy collection area of 110 m2 (1184 square ft). The energy is then stored to power the station when it passes into the Earth's shadow. Resupply ships will replenish fuel for LCM 1 for station-keeping, to counter the effects of atmospheric drag.

Aftermath
It successfully docked with the Tianhe core module nearly thirteen hours after launch.

During the re-entry phase of the Long March rocket's main core stage, NASA Administrator Bill Nelson voiced criticism for allowing the stage to return to the Earth in an uncontrolled re-entry. The stage eventually made re-entry and splashed down over the Pacific Ocean on 30 July 2022, with the bulk of it burning up on re-entry and no known pieces that survived re-entry causing damage.

Assembly
The Shenzhou 14 mission to the space station is assisting with setting up the Wentian module in orbit.

Airlock
The Wentian laboratory module has a specially made airlock with the main purpose of conducting extravehicular activity as it features a much larger accommodation of space when compared to the EVA airlock on spherical docking hub on the Tianhe. Hence, it will become the primary choice for hosting spacewalks. On 1 September 2022 (10:26 UTC), the first spacewalk was carried out by Chen Dong and Liu Yang as they exited the Wentian airlock for the first time to conduct extravehicular activities.

Gallery

See also
 Mengtian module
 Tianhe Core Module
 Xuntian Space Telescope

References

External links
 Chinese Space Agency website

Chinese space stations
Spacecraft launched in 2022
2022 in China